Fayetteville Ice and Manufacturing Company: Plant and Engineer's House is a historic ice factory and home located at Fayetteville, Cumberland County, North Carolina.  The ice plant was built in 1908, is constructed of brick and is composed of several sections including an ice storage room, a tank or freezing section, and an engine room. The engineer's house is a one-story center-hall plan frame dwelling with a rear ell and hip roof.  It features a one-story full-facade porch with Tuscan order columns.

It was listed on the National Register of Historic Places in 1983.

References

Industrial buildings and structures on the National Register of Historic Places in North Carolina
Houses on the National Register of Historic Places in North Carolina
Industrial buildings completed in 1908
Buildings and structures in Fayetteville, North Carolina
National Register of Historic Places in Cumberland County, North Carolina
Houses in Cumberland County, North Carolina
1908 establishments in North Carolina